A P.A.F., or simply PAF ("Patent Applied For"), is an early model of the humbucker guitar pickup invented by Seth Lover in 1955. Gibson began use of the PAF on higher-model guitars in late 1956 and stopped in late 1962. They were replaced by the Patent Number (Pat No) pickup, essentially a refined version of the PAF. These were in turn replaced by "T-Top" humbuckers in 1967, and production ended in 1975. Though it is commonly mistaken as the first humbucker pickup, the PAF was the first humbucker to gain widespread use and notoriety. The PAF is an essential tonal characteristic of the now-famous 1957–1960 Gibson Les Paul Standard guitars, and pickups of this type have gained a large following.

History

Development
In the mid-1950s Gibson looked to create a new guitar pickup different from existing popular single coil designs. Gibson had already developed the Charlie Christian pickup and P-90 in the 1930s and 40s; however, these designs—like competitor Fender's single-coil pickups—were fraught with inherent 60-cycle hum sound interference. Engineer and Gibson employee Seth Lover spent much of 1954 working on a noise-cancelling or "hum-bucking" guitar pickup design. By early 1955, the design was completed. It was given the part code P-490. In June 1955, Lover and Gibson filed a joint patent for the pickup design. The original design called explicitly for Alnico 5 magnets, but early examples can be Alnico 2, Alnico 3, or Alnico 5.

Early use
Gibson began switching from P-90s to PAFs first on the company's lap steel guitars in 1956, and then on electric guitars debuted at the NAMM Show in 1957. Les Paul Goldtops and Customs were the first solid-body electric guitars to receive PAF humbuckers, and Gibson's ES Series were the first hollow/semi-hollow designs to receive them.

The Les Pauls of 1957 featured a black sticker with gold lettering applied to each pickup's underside, reading "PATENT APPLIED FOR." Over time the Patent Applied For sticker present on these pickups has evolved into the acronym P.A.F. as a way to identify pickups with this sticker. The patent for Gibson's design was eventually issued on July 28, 1959. The acronym P.A.F. is also sometimes written as PAF leaving the periods out. However, in 1978 the word "PAF" was registered as a trademark by DiMarzio. (This registered trademark should not to be confused with original P.A.F. acronym used to describe the original vintage pickups made by Gibson and the subject of this article.)

In 1958 the Goldtop model was dropped from production, and the sunburst Standard took its place. These guitars were all fitted with PAF humbuckers, which contributed greatly to the instruments' sound.

1961–1966
Early 1961 PAFs are almost exactly identical to the original 1957–1960 PAFs. In July 1961 Gibson standardized the PAF construction process with the introduction of the SG model. With this, smaller Alnico 5 magnets became standard. Transition to a new start lead location and a more formal number of wire winds was also introduced, leading to pickup DC resistance to center around 7.5kΩ. In addition, around 1963 these pickups were given a new sticker that had a patent number written on it. However, the stickers were, and continued to be, labelled with "", which is the number issued to the 1952 Les Paul trapeze tailpiece design and not the humbucking pickups. Between 1965–1966, Gibson switched to polyurethane-coated wire from enamel-coated to cut costs and streamline pigtail lead soldering time, changing the wire color from purple to red.

1967–1980
Around the time of the last small-guard SG's offered in early 1966, Gibson standardized a T-shaped tool mark on the top of humbucker bobbins. This new style of Gibson humbucker became known as the T-Top. The "T" located on the top of the bobbins helped workers ensure the bobbin was facing the correct way during the winding and assembly process. T-Top bobbins lose the distinctive square hole of the original PAF bobbins. In addition the coil former geometry of the T-Top bobbin differs from the coil former dimensions of PAF bobbins making T-Top bobbins slightly taller and more robust internally than PAF bobbins. Early T-Top humbuckers retain the same patent number sticker on the baseplate into the early 1970s. These early patent sticker T-Top humbuckers have the same wood spacer and short A2 and A5 magnets of the previous iteration. Eventually the patent sticker on the baseplate was replaced by a stamped patent number. With this change, other specification began to change such as magnet specifications and use of a plastic rather than wooden spacer. Gibson produced T-Top pickups through 1980 but many consider the early patent sticker T-Tops more collectible than later versions.

PAF reissues

In 1981 Gibson realized that there was a consumer demand for the sound of original PAF pickups. Engineer Tim Shaw designed a pickup that aimed to replicate the early design, reversing changes made in the 1960s and 1970s: a new bobbin without the "T", a correct small square hole back in both bobbins, and Alnico magnets. Shaw's efforts are generally considered to be the first of many recreations of the PAF humbucking pickup. However Gibson did not take Tim Shaw's recommendation to use plain enamel magnet wire due to cost concerns. As a result, Shaw era pickups still use polysol magnet wire.

Gibson currently produces several reissues of PAFs including the "'57 Classic", "Burstbucker" and "Custom Buckers".

Signature sound
Early PAFs are among the most-sought-after vintage humbucker pickups by guitarists, and each individual pickup is unique in terms of output level and tone. Factors that account for their sound are:

 Gibson used four different machines to wind vintage P.A.F. pickups. Two of the four machines lacked auto stop mechanisms resulting in variation in turns for each of the bobbins that make up the P.A.F. pickup assembly. The resulting inconsistency in turn count led to variation in the output and tone. For the same reason, the two coils within each pickup unit usually have a slightly different number of turns, which affects the treble overtones of the assembled pickup.
 Gibson used Alnico magnets in PAFs, the same magnet as used in the P-90. Alnico has several different grades with different tonal properties. In original P.A.F. pickups the grades Alnico 2, 3, and 5 were used (with Alnico 3 being the least common).
 Original P.A.F. magnets were charged in groups. This process yielded magnets that were not fully charged to saturation. Vintage P.A.F. and P-90 magnets therefore can lose some charge over time, which affects the tone of the pickup. (P-90's in particular are more prone to this effect.)

References

Further reading

External links
  — PAF pickup itself, hum cancellation

Guitar pickups
Gibson Brands